Eternity Bible College (EBC) is a private Bible college in Simi Valley, California. It was founded by Francis Chan, former pastor of Cornerstone Community Church. The college is accredited by the Association for Biblical Higher Education.

History
EBC was founded by Francis Chan as a ministry of Cornerstone Community Church. In 2001, Cornerstone launched a Bible Institute to better equip its members for ministry. In 2003, they resolved to turn this into a college. Over the course of the next year, Cornerstone gathered personnel and resources, and launched the college in 2004 with a class of 100 students.

The faculty consists of pastors serving in local churches in the greater Los Angeles area.

The college offers a Bachelor of Biblical Studies and a Certificate of Biblical Studies. The emphasis of these programs is on studying the Bible for the purpose of applying biblical principles to all areas of life and ministry.

As of May 2016, EBC has graduated over 200 students. Its graduates are currently serving as missionaries (in Israel, France, India, Hungary, and Iraq), pastors, youth pastors, are pursuing seminary-level education, or have joined the workforce in a variety of capacities.

References

External links
 

Universities and colleges in Ventura County, California
Seminaries and theological colleges in California
Educational institutions established in 2004
2004 establishments in California